The England of Elizabeth is a 1957 documentary about the Elizabethan age, directed by John Taylor for British Transport Films. It is particularly noted for its score composed by Ralph Vaughan Williams. The soundtrack script (by Gloucestershire novelist John Moore) is read by veteran Shakespearean actor Alec Clunes.

Vaughan Williams' score was the basis for the concert work Three Portraits from the England of Elizabeth.

References

External links
 

1957 films
British short documentary films
British Transport Films
1950s short documentary films
1957 documentary films
Documentary films about historical events
Tudor England in popular culture
Films about Elizabeth I
Films scored by Ralph Vaughan Williams
1950s English-language films
1950s British films